Warren G. Harding Middle School is a historic middle school located in the Frankford neighborhood of Philadelphia, Pennsylvania. It is part of the School District of Philadelphia.

It was designed by Irwin T. Catharine and built in 1923 to 1925 at a cost of just over $1 million.  It is a three-story, 17-bay-wide and 12-bay-deep, brick-and-limestone building in the Colonial Revival style.  It features a projecting center entrance pavilion with arched openings, stone cornice, and balustraded parapet. The school was named for President Warren G. Harding.

The building was added to the National Register of Historic Places in 1988.

References

External links

School buildings on the National Register of Historic Places in Philadelphia
Colonial Revival architecture in Pennsylvania
School buildings completed in 1924
Frankford, Philadelphia
Public middle schools in Pennsylvania
School District of Philadelphia
1924 establishments in Pennsylvania